Thomas Patrick O'Regan (born December 29, 1961) is an American former professional ice hockey forward. He played 61 games in the National Hockey League with the Pittsburgh Penguins from 1984 to 1985. He then played in the German Bundesliga and Deutsche Eishockey Liga from 1987 to 1998. Internationally O'Regan played for the American national team at four World Championships.

Career
O'Regan was a high school star at Matignon High School. O'Regan played 61 games for the Pittsburgh Penguins of the National Hockey League (NHL) in the mid 1980s. The majority of his career was spent in Germany where he was a top scorer in the Bundesliga for many years.

O'Regan played four years at Boston University, and was signed as a free agent by the Pittsburgh Penguins following his senior year. He played 51 games for the floundering Penguins during the 1983–84 season but was used rarely thereafter. Between 1985 and 1987 he recorded three straight 20-goal seasons in the American Hockey League (AHL). He joined the EV Landshut club of Germany in 1987–88 and played two seasons there. He later skated for the Devils and Capitals clubs of Berlin. O'Regan played for the United States at the World Championships in 1989, 1990, 1995 and 1996, winning a bronze medal at the latter. In 61 NHL games O'Regan recorded 5 goals and 12 assists for 17 career points.

Family
His son Danny O'Regan was selected 138th overall by the San Jose Sharks in the 2012 NHL Entry Draft and currently plays for the Hartford Wolf Pack in the American Hockey League. Another son, Tommy O'Regan, played hockey for Harvard University and is now a stand-up comedian.

Career statistics

Regular season and playoffs

International

Transactions
 September 4, 1983 – Signed as a free agent by the Pittsburgh Penguins.
 September 29, 1986 – Signed as a free agent by the Detroit Red Wings.

References

External links
 

1961 births
Living people
Adirondack Red Wings players
American men's ice hockey forwards
Baltimore Skipjacks players
Berlin Capitals players
Boston University alumni
Boston University Terriers men's ice hockey players
BSC Preussen Berlin players
EV Landshut players
Ice hockey players from Massachusetts
Pittsburgh Penguins players
Sportspeople from Cambridge, Massachusetts
Undrafted National Hockey League players